Events from the year 1759 in Sweden

Incumbents
 Monarch – Adolf Frederick

Events

 10 September - Battle of Frisches Haff
 19 July - The Great Stockholm Fire 1759 reduced about 20 blocks with about 300 houses to ash, and rendered about 2000 persons homeless.
 - The Royal Swedish Society of Sciences and Letters is founded.
 - Vinterkväde by Gustaf Fredrik Gyllenborg

Births

 2 March  - Johann Christian Friedrich Haeffner, composer  (died 1833)
 23 March  - Anders Ljungstedt, historian (died 1835) 
 18 April – Thomas Thorild, poet, critic and philosopher (died 1808) 
 16 August – Carl Fredric von Breda, painter (died 1818) 
 – Anna Sophia Holmstedt, ballerina (died 1807) 
 - Charlotte Eckerman, opera singer and courtesan (died 1790)
 Johan Anton Lindqvist, theatre director (died 1833)

Deaths

 20 June  – Margareta Capsia, painter (born 1682)

References

 
Years of the 18th century in Sweden